is an action game originally published in arcades by Konami in 1984. The player controls a circus clown named Charlie in six different circus-themed minigames. It was released for MSX in the same year, followed by ports to the Famicom in 1986 by Soft Pro and the Commodore 64 in 1987.

Gameplay

In the game there are six regular stages (plus an extra stage) of differing tasks that are to be completed by Charlie. Grabbing money bags, performing dangerous tricks, avoiding enemies, completing stages, etc., earns Charlie points. After the sixth stage is completed, the game starts over again but with a faster pace and more difficult (but exactly the same in terms of task to be completed) levels.

Charlie also races against time. Bonus points are awarded according to the time remaining, but running out of time will cost the player a life.

Levels
The standard Arcade version has 6 levels in total. Levels 1, 2, 4 and 5 have 5 sublevels. Level 3 contains 7 sublevels. Each sublevel gets more difficult. Level 6 also has 5 sublevels, but repeats as long the user has lives.

Level 1: ride on a lion and jump through flaming rings
Level 2: tightrope walking whilst jumping over monkeys
Level 3: Jump between trampolines and beware the knife throwers and fire breathers. In sublevel 3 and 6 the trampolines are placed in a swimming pool and the knife throwers and fire breathers are replaced by jumping dolphins. This level is not present in the MSX and Famicom/NES ports of the game.
Level 4: Jump from ball to ball
Level 5: Ride a horse and jump over trampolines and walls
Level 6: Swing from one trapeze to the next

Versions

In arcades, there's a "Level Select" version of the game, in which the player can choose any of the stages to play, but only a limited number of times each, whereupon the level will become unselectable. There is no "ending" to the game—after the first five levels have each been played to their limit, the player then repeats the trapeze stage until all their lives are exhausted.

The Famicom version just like MSX port drops the trampoline stage, but offers a "B" mode, in which all the levels are repeated with added difficulty.  The game often shows up on Famicom clone systems and multicarts, usually with its title screen altered to remove copyright,  some versions also have the levels split up to make up separate games in multicarts.

The music comes from "American Patrol" and "The Blue Danube".

Reception 
In Japan, Game Machine listed Circus Charlie on their May 15, 1984 issue as being the third most-successful table arcade unit of the month.

Legacy
In Mikie, another Konami arcade game, headbutting the teacher's desk from below three times in the classroom stage will make Circus Charlie appear, giving the player extra points.

Circus Charlie was released along with other Konami classic games on the Nintendo DS compilation Konami Classics Series: Arcade Hits.

Other media 
 Circus Charlie is one of the video games that were adapted into a manga titled , published in the Gamest comics collection from April 1999, drawn by Kouta Hirano.
 Charlie has a cameo appearance in the panel Seinen manga Konami 4Koma Manga Wai Wai World which is part of the Famicom Runners High.

References

External links
 Circus Charlie entry at the Centuri.net Arcade Database

1984 video games
Arcade video games
Action video games
ColecoVision games
Commodore 64 games
Konami games
MSX games
Nintendo Entertainment System games
Nintendo Switch games
PlayStation 4 games
SG-1000 games
Video games about clowns
Video games set in amusement parks
Virtual Console games
Virtual Console games for Wii U
Konami arcade games
Video games developed in Japan
Hamster Corporation games